ABC Local Radio is a network of publicly owned radio stations in Australia, operated by the Australian Broadcasting Corporation.

ABC Local Radio stations broadcast across the continent using terrestrial transmitters and satellites. Its programming consists of news, current affairs, talkback, entertainment, sport, music and local affairs.  They are usually reckoned as the flagship ABC radio stations in their areas.

Depending on the time of day and the day of the week, programming can either be purely local (typically on weekday mornings), broadcast from the state or territory capital city ABC station, or simulcast across all ABC Local Radio services across the country (typically overnight, public holidays, in the summer months and on weekends).

History
Originally, Local Radio was known internally as ABC Radio 1 in metropolitan regions and ABC Radio 3 in regional areas. Radio 1 was a largely local format while Radio 3 was more networked and included content from the national programme, Radio 2.

In the 1980s, Radio National emerged from Radio 2 and Radio 3 dropped its Radio 2 content with Radio 1 becoming ABC Metropolitan Radio and Radio 3 becoming ABC Regional Radio. The Regional Radio stations provided local programming in breakfast and drive but networked common content for most of their broadcasting hours. Some different, local market formats emerged, including the Darwin Metro 8DDD on FM105.7 and Gold Coast Regional, ABC Coast FM (4SCR), 91.7. Up until the mid-1990s, the majority of the local radio stations identified on-air by frequency and callsign. In the 1990s, a different convention was used, generally as ABC Radio (region) or (region) FM.

In 2000, these two almost identical networks merged as ABC Local Radio. From this point all ABC Local Radio stations ceased to identify themselves according to their callsigns or other existing names, and instead use the format (frequency) ABC (region), or ABC (region) where there are multiple frequencies broadcasting the same service. However, as the callsigns were used continuously for up to seventy years and are much shorter than the new names, many long-term listeners still use these callsigns to refer to ABC Local Radio stations.

In January 2017, ABC Local Radio rebranded with a new logo, dropping the frequency number of each local radio station as part of the network's multiplatform philosophy. All stations now use the format ABC Radio with the region.

In April 2019, ABC Local Radio has begun a rollout of branding updates for its 44 regional bureaux, ten regional stations dropping call signs from their names and two undergoing a significant name change to better identify their local region.

Stations

There are sixty ABC Local Radio stations across 53 regions, including 52 regional stations and 8 metropolitan stations. The metropolitan stations are:
ABC Radio Sydney (2BL)
ABC Radio Melbourne (3LO)
ABC Radio Brisbane (4QR)
ABC Radio Adelaide (5AN)
ABC Radio Perth (6WF)
ABC Radio Hobart (7ZR)
ABC Radio Canberra (2CN)
ABC Radio Darwin (8DDD)

The regional stations are:

ABC Broken Hill (2NB)
ABC Central Coast (2BL)
ABC Central West (2CR)
ABC Coffs Coast (2MMR)
ABC Illawarra (2ILA)
ABC Mid North Coast (2KP)
ABC New England North West (2NU)
ABC Newcastle (2NC)
ABC North Coast (2NNR)
ABC Riverina (2RVR)
ABC South East NSW (2BA)
ABC Upper Hunter (2UH)
ABC Western Plains (2WPR)
ABC Ballarat (3CRR)
ABC Central Victoria (3ABCRR)
ABC Gippsland (3GLR)
ABC Goulburn Murray (3MRR)
ABC Mildura Swan Hill (3MIL)
ABC Shepparton (3GVR)
ABC South West Victoria (3WL)
ABC Wimmera (3WV)
ABC Northern Tasmania (7NT)
ABC Capricornia (4RK)
ABC Gold Coast (4ABCRR)
ABC Far North (4QCC)
ABC North Queensland (4QN)
ABC North West Queensland (4ISA)
ABC Southern Queensland (4QS)
ABC Sunshine Coast (4SCR)
ABC Tropical North (4QAA)
ABC Western Queensland (4QL)
ABC Wide Bay (4QB)
ABC North and West SA (5CK)
ABC Riverland (5MV)
ABC South East SA (5MG)
ABC Eyre Peninsula (5LN)
ABC Goldfields-Esperance (6ED, 6GF)
ABC Great Southern (6WA)
ABC Kimberley (6BE)
ABC Midwest & Wheatbelt (6GN)
ABC Pilbara (6KP)
ABC South Coast (6AL)
ABC South West WA (6BS)
ABC Alice Springs (8AL)
ABC Katherine (8ABCRR)

Digital stations: 
ABC Country
ABC Sport

Programming
The metropolitan and regional stations originate most of their own programming.

Until 2015, the regional stations usually simulcast one of the metropolitan stations when they were not airing local programming. Usually, they simulcast their state's capital city station; an exception was 999 ABC Broken Hill, which simulcasts 891 ABC Adelaide because Broken Hill is on Central Time.  In 2015, the ABC formed a Regional Division to again split its regional stations from the metropolitan counterparts.  1233 ABC Newcastle (2NC) was transferred from the metropolitan network to the new regional division  and 14 of the regional network's member stations began streaming.

It was announced from 2016 that the regional Local Radio stations would broadcast live each weekday and Saturday morning in a restructure of services, as well as a local Country Hour program at midday and afternoon drive time. During the mid-afternoon and evening, the regional stations will act as satellites of the nearest metropolitan station, usually the capital city station.

Despite the loss of 100 websites from the ABC, the regional network introduced local news websites for its 48 stations containing a mix of news and lifestyle content for regional audiences.

Some programmes are aired first on ABC Radio National, and then at a later time on the Local Radio network, for example
Speaking Out, hosted by Larissa Behrendt, which  broadcasts on Radio National on Fridays at 8pm and on Local Radio on Sundays at 9pm.

See also 
 Radio National
 Radio Australia
 Timeline of Australian radio

References

External links
 ABC Local Radio
 Australian Broadcasting Corporation

 
Australian Broadcasting Corporation radio
Australian radio networks